Hot Blood is a 2009 South Korean drama based on the Manhwa with the same title by Park In-kwon starring Park Hae-jin, Chae Jung-an, Choi Cheol-ho and Jo Yoon-hee. It aired every Saturdays at 10:15 pm and Sundays at 10:25 pm for 20 episodes.

This series depicts the hard-working, life, and love of a car salesman. However, as a love story is added from the middle of the series, it make the plot is blurred and the ratings of 9% were below expectations.

Plot
Revolves around penniless Ha-ryu who is driven by upward mobility and a thirst for personal success. Here is a man who can do whatever it takes to make money. He dreams of raking in 10 billion won by selling cars. Due to this wild idea, he is deemed crazy by everyone, but is ready to sell even his soul to become a billionaire. "I will make myself fully prepared to take every chance that lies ahead of me!!!" --KBS World

Cast

Main
Park Hae-jin as Ha-Ryoo
Chae Jung-an as Kim Jae-hee
Choi Cheol-ho as Kang Seung-joo
Jo Yoon-hee as Min Da-hae

Supporting
Lee Won-jong as Mae Wang (Choi Go-dong), a car dealer
Lee Sung-min as Yang Man-chul, a salesman
Jung Dong-hwan as President Song, the Taepoong Car company's president
Jang Tae-sung as Yong-Goo, the former car thief
Kim Gun as a car salesman

People around Ha-Ryoo
Cho Jin-woong as Lee Soon-kil, a car salesman
Jung Young-sook as Ha-Ryoo's mother
Choi Jong-won as Ha-Ryoo's father
Cha Soo-yeon as Se-Yeon, Ha-Ryoo's ex-lover

People around Seung-joo
Song Jae-ho as President Yoo, Daesang group's president
Kim Kyu-chul as Director Yoon, President Yoo's right-hand man
Lee Jae-yong as Song Man-deuk
Kang Jae-sub as Kim Duk-bae, Kang Seung-joo's secretary and driver

People around Da-hae
Han Ye-won as Hong Ji-oh, Da-hae's roommate and best friend
Jung Sung-ho as Da-hae's father

Others
Yang Taek-jo as Heo Jung-jae
Oh-Yong as Chang-Shik, a senior car salesman
Lee Dong-kyoo as Kim-Bin
Lee Seol-ah as Mi-Jung, a car saleswoman
Kim Sung-hoon as a night sales manager
Kang Soo-han as Kim Gi-young
Yun Je-wook
Choi Yoon-young
Kim Ki-hyun
Goo Jung-rim
 – as Ran Yi
Kwak In-joon
Heo Jae-ho
Baek-Min

Rating

References

External links
  

Korean Broadcasting System television dramas
Korean-language television shows
2009 South Korean television series debuts
2009 South Korean television series endings
Television series by Hwa&Dam Pictures